National Marine Conservation Areas (NMCAs) is a Parks Canada programme responsible for marine areas managed for sustainability and containing smaller zones of high protection. They include the seabed, the water itself and any species which occur there. They may also include wetlands, estuaries, islands and other coastal lands.
They are protected from dumping, undersea mining and oil and gas exploration and development, which may damage the aquatic or terrestrial ecosystems in the conservation area. However, not all commercial activities are prohibited in these zones. Shipping, commercial and sport fishing, and recreational activities are allowed.

Marine conservation at Nature Canada
In 1996, Nature Canada developed its Marine Conservation Program in recognition that marine ecosystems were as affected by human activity as terrestrial ecosystems. At that time, Canada's National Parks Act was designed to guide conservation and protection only on land. So that year, Nature Canada began advocating for new legislation that would enable the creation of national marine conservation areas. Over the next several years we met with federal government policy decision-makers, gave testimony at hearings, and conducted a public awareness campaign about marine conservation areas.

List of National Marine Conservation Areas
, established NMCAs and NMCA Reserves protect  of waters, wetlands, and coastlines, representing five of the 29 identified marine regions with studies underway for protected areas in three additional regions.

Proposed National Marine Conservation Areas

See also

 List of national parks of Canada
 National Parks of Canada
 Marine Protected Areas of Canada

References

External links
 National Marine Conservation Areas website

Conservation areas of Canada
Marine protected areas
Marine parks of Canada